Teenage Mutant Ninja Turtles II: The Secret of the Ooze: The Original Motion Picture Soundtrack is the licensed soundtrack to the 1991 New Line Cinema film Teenage Mutant Ninja Turtles II: The Secret of the Ooze. It was released by SBK Records on March 26, 1991.

The atmosphere of this collection is much more kid friendly than the previous album. Songs like "This World" and "Back to School" feature various virtuous themes in their lyrics such as world peace, staying in school, and environmentalism. The most recognizable song in this collection is Vanilla Ice's song "Ninja Rap", which he performed in the film.

Reception

In 1991, Select gave the album a rating of one out of five, stating the album "is despicable. Every kind of dance music has been drugged and sodomised into submission until it becomes anodyne and trite enough to accompany the weakest of children's parties."

Track list 
 "Awesome (You Are My Hero)" by Ya Kid K
 "Ninja Rap" performed by Vanilla Ice
 "Find The Key To Your Life" by Cathy Dennis featuring David Morales
 "Moov!" by Tribal House
 "(That's Your) Consciousness" by Dan Hartman
 "This World" by Magnificent VII
 "Creatures of Habit" by Spunkadelic
 "Back to School" by Fifth Platoon
 "Cowabunga" by Orchestra on the Half Shell
 "Tokka and Rahzar: Monster Mix" by Orchestra on the Half Shell

Certifications

Notes 
 The album version of '"Ninja Rap" has a higher tempo than the film version.
 The album version of "Awesome (You Are My Hero)" omits the chorus' background vocals heard during the film's end credits.
 An arranged instrumental version of "(That's Your) Consciousness" is played over the film's opening credits.

References

External links
 TMNT soundtrack information on the official TMNT website
 Music from the film on IMDb.com
 TMNT II soundtrack on Amazon.com
 TMNT videos

Secret of the Ooze: Original Motion Picture Soundtrack
1991 soundtrack albums
SBK Records soundtracks
Superhero film soundtracks
Comedy film soundtracks
Teenage Mutant Ninja Turtles (1990 film series)